Elections to the French National Assembly were held in French Somaliland on 2 June 1946, with a second round on 16 June as part of the wider parliamentary elections. René Bernard-Cothier was re-elected as the territory's MP.

Results

References

French Somaliland
1946 in French Somaliland
Elections in Djibouti
June 1946 events in Africa